= Late Baroque =

Late Baroque, last stage of the Baroque era, may refer to:

- Rococo – art, architecture
- Late Baroque (music) – music
